Ventersdorp Local Municipality was a local municipality in Dr Kenneth Kaunda District Municipality, North West Province, South Africa. The seat of local municipality was Ventersdorp. After the municipal elections on 3 August 2016 it was merged into the larger JB Marks Local Municipality.

Main places
The 2001 census divided the municipality into the following main places:

Politics 
The municipal council consisted of twelve members elected by mixed-member proportional representation. Six councillors were elected by first-past-the-post voting in six wards, while the remaining six were chosen from party lists so that the total number of party representatives was proportional to the number of votes received. In the election of 18 May 2011 the African National Congress (ANC) won a majority of ten seats on the council.

The following table shows the results of the election.

References

External links
 Official Website

Local municipalities of the Dr Kenneth Kaunda District Municipality